is a trolleybus station in Tateyama, Toyama, Japan. It is situated on the Murodō Plateau, 2,400 m above sea level.

Murodō is the main station providing access to the Japanese Alps, including Mount Tate and Mount Tsurugi.

Lines
Tateyama Kurobe Kankō
Tateyama Tunnel Trolley Bus (Tateyama Kurobe Alpine Route)

Adjacent stations

External links

 Tateyama Kurobe Alpine Route official website

Tateyama, Toyama